Liliane Cleiren (born 1 April 1942) is a former Belgian racing cyclist. She finished in third place in the Belgian National Road Race Championships in 1959 and 1962.

References

External links

1942 births
Living people
Belgian female cyclists
Place of birth missing (living people)